Oranmore railway station is a railway station that serves the town of Oranmore and its surrounding areas in County Galway.

Services
Oranmore is a stop on the Dublin – Galway intercity service and the Galway – Athenry/Athlone and Galway – Limerick Commuter services.
Journey time is approximately 10 minutes from Oranmore to Galway Ceannt.

Bicycle parking and car parking facilities are provided. The 140 space car park at the station is owned and operated by Galway County Council.

From Oranmore along the Western Rail Corridor connecting trains in Limerick provide onward links to Limerick Junction (for Tipperary, and Waterford) and Cork.

History
The original Oranmore station was opened in 1851 by the MGWR on its route from Dublin to Galway. The station was open until the rationalisation of the railway network by Córas Iompair Éireann saw it closed in 1963, with the building sold as a private residence.

Development

The station serves as a park and ride for commuters into Galway. As a consequence of this, the old station was not rebuilt; instead, the new station is located at Garraun. Oranmore serves as an intermediate stop both for services to Galway from Limerick, and for the Galway Suburban Rail services from Athenry.

Oranmore was not included in the initial opening of Phase 1 of the Western Rail Corridor. Originally planned for opening in 2011. It reopened on Sunday 28 July 2013.

References

External links
 Irish Rail Oranmore Website
 Oranmore opening day from photo website of 'The Wanderer'

Buildings and structures in Galway (city)
Iarnród Éireann stations in County Galway
Railway stations in County Galway
Transport in Galway (city)
Railway stations opened in 2013
2013 establishments in Ireland
Railway stations opened in 1851
1851 establishments in Ireland
Railway stations closed in 1963
1963 disestablishments in Ireland
Railway stations in the Republic of Ireland opened in 1851
Railway stations in the Republic of Ireland opened in the 21st century